was a station located on the Kurihara Den'en Railway Company Kurihara Den'en Railway Line in Kurihara, Miyagi Prefecture, Japan.

Line
Kurihara Den'en Railway Company Kurihara Den'en Railway Line

Surrounding area
Rural fields surround the station

History
15 May 1953: Station begins operation.
1 April 2007: Station ends operation.

Railway stations in Miyagi Prefecture
Kurihara Den'en Railway Line
Defunct railway stations in Japan
Railway stations in Japan opened in 1953
Railway stations closed in 2007